A Kind of Family is a Canadian documentary film, directed by Andrew Koster and released in 1992. The film centres on Glen Murray, at the time a Winnipeg City Councillor and one of Canada's first openly gay politicians, and Mike, a gay, HIV-positive street kid whom Murray took in as a foster parent.

The film received limited theatrical distribution before being broadcast by CBC Television as an episode of the Witness documentary series. It received a Genie Award nomination for Best Short Documentary at the 13th Genie Awards.

References

External links

A Kind of Family at the National Film Board of Canada

1992 films
Canadian short documentary films
Canadian LGBT-related short films
Documentary films about gay men
Documentary films about male prostitution
Documentary films about adoption
Documentary films about street children
Documentary films about HIV/AIDS
National Film Board of Canada documentaries
Films shot in Winnipeg
1992 LGBT-related films
Documentary films about prostitution in Canada
Documentary films about homelessness in Canada
HIV/AIDS in Canadian films
1990s Canadian films